Commodore Prasanna Alahakoon, USP, psc, SLN is a Sri Lanka naval officer and engineer. He is the current Deputy Superintendent of the SLN Dockyard and former Deputy Director Naval Projects and Plans as well as the Head of the Department of Electrical and Electronics of the General Sir John Kotelawala Defence University.

Educated at the prestiges Royal College Colombo, entered the University of Moratuwa to study engineering. However he left to join the Sri Lanka Navy without graduating and gained a BTech in engineering from the Naval College of Engineering, Lonavla (INS Shivaji) and specialized in electrical engineering at INS Valsura, Jamnagar. He is a graduate of the Naval War College, with a BSc in War Studies and holds an MBA in Management of Technology from the University of Moratuwa.

Alahakoon has served in the Engineering Branch of the Sri Lanka Navy serving as the Deputy Director Naval Projects and Plans at SLNS Parakrama the naval headquarter. He has also served as the Head of the Department of Electrical and Electronics of the General Sir John Kotelawala Defence University.

Commodore Alahakoon has been awarded the service medals Uttama Seva Padakkama, Sri Lanka Armed Services Long Service Medal and the campaign medal Eastern Humanitarian Operations Medal.

See also 
Sri Lanka Navy

References 

Sinhalese engineers
Alumni of Royal College, Colombo
Naval War College alumni
Academic staff of the General Sir John Kotelawala Defence University
Living people
Year of birth missing (living people)
Sri Lankan commodores